Amalie Kärcher (1819–1887) was a German painter who produced 
still life and flower paintings. She was born in Durlach and died in Karlsruhe.

She is known for works produced in Karlsruhe during the years 1846–1875.

Gallery

See also
 List of German women artists

References

External links 
 

1819 births
1887 deaths
19th-century German painters
German women painters
Flower artists
19th-century German women artists